The 2020 Deloitte Tankard, the provincial men's curling championship of Nova Scotia, was held from January 20 to 26 at the Dartmouth Curling Club in Dartmouth. The winning Jamie Murphy rink represented Nova Scotia at the 2020 Tim Hortons Brier in Kingston, Ontario and finished with a 3–4 record. The event was held in conjunction with the 2020 Nova Scotia Scotties Tournament of Hearts, the provincial women's curling championship.

Jamie Murphy won his sixth Nova Scotia Men's provincial title when he defeated Kendal Thompson's team 10-4 in the final.

Qualification process

Teams
The teams are listed as follows:

Round-robin standings
Final round-robin standings

Round-robin results
All draw times are listed in Atlantic Standard Time (UTC-04:00).

Draw 1
Monday, January 20, 3:00 pm

Draw 2
Tuesday, January 21, 9:00 am

Draw 3
Tuesday, January 21, 7:00 pm

Draw 4
Wednesday, January 22, 2:00 pm

Draw 5
Thursday, January 23, 9:00 am

Draw 6
Thursday, January 23, 7:00 pm

Draw 7
Friday, January 24, 2:00 pm

Tiebreakers
Saturday, January 25, 9:00 am

Saturday, January 25, 2:00 pm

Playoffs

Semifinal
Saturday, January 25, 7:00 pm

Final
Sunday, January 26, 9:00 am

References

Deloitte Tankard
2020 Tim Hortons Brier
Curling competitions in Halifax, Nova Scotia
Sport in Dartmouth, Nova Scotia
2020 in Nova Scotia